Ballabh is a given name. Notable people with the name include:

Janaki Ballabh Patnaik (1927–2015), Indian politician who has been Governor of Assam since 2009
Janki Ballabh Shastri (1916–2011), Indian Hindi poet, writer and critic

See also
Chhoti ballabh, village in the Gonda block of Iglas tehsil in Aligarh district, in Uttar Pradesh state in India
Govind Ballabh Pant Engineering College run by the state government of Uttarakhand, India
Govind Ballabh Pant Sagar, man made lake situated in southern region of Sonebhadra
Govind Ballabh Pant Social Science Institute in Allahabad, India
Govind Ballabh Pant University of Agriculture & Technology, the first agricultural university of India
Ballaban
Ballabeg
Ballabio
Ballabur
Vallabhi

Hindu given names